The Forthmann Carriage House, is a Los Angeles Historic-Cultural Monument (No. 103) located in Angelino Heights, Los Angeles, California. It is a 1,000 sq. ft. Victorian style carriage house built 1882, designed by Burgess J. Reeve. It was relocated in March 2006 from its original location at 629 West 18th Street. Los Angeles, California to its current location at 812 E Edgeware Rd. Los Angeles, California. The relocation was made possible thanks to the efforts of Barbara Behm, an independent developer who restored many properties in Angeleno Heights.

Sometime in the 1880s, Burgess J. Reeve designed a 4,200 square foot, eleven-room Victorian mansion for John A. Forthmann. Forthmann, a German immigrant, had made his money from founding and running the Los Angeles Soap Co. The business, most famous for its White King brand (“It takes so little”), at one point covered about sixteen acres of downtown. Forthmann died in 1922.

The Forthmann Carriage House is currently owned and in the process of restoration by Ithyle Griffiths and Angela Kohler.

See also
 List of Los Angeles Historic-Cultural Monuments in South Los Angeles

References

External links
 Big Orange Landmarks article on Forthmann House

Houses in Los Angeles
Houses completed in 1887
Los Angeles Historic-Cultural Monuments
Italianate architecture in California
Victorian architecture in California
Relocated buildings and structures in California